Nadunga "June" Kyakobye (born 25 June 1967) is a Ugandan table tennis player. She competed in the women's singles event at the 1996 Summer Olympics.

References

External links
 

1967 births
Living people
Ugandan female table tennis players
Olympic table tennis players of Uganda
Table tennis players at the 1996 Summer Olympics
Place of birth missing (living people)